American Boulevard is a light rail station in Bloomington, Minnesota at the intersection of 34th Avenue South and American Boulevard, just south of Interstate 494. It is the only station on the Blue Line to have a split design where the northbound platform is on the opposite end of the intersection from the southbound platform. It is an infill station, that was built after the rest of the line had been completed. It was included in the original plans for the Blue Line, but was shelved when extra costs incurred caused plans for the Mall of America station to change. The station had a dedication ceremony for construction workers on December 9, 2009 and opened on December 12, 2009.

References
MassTransitMag.com: Two New Stations in the Works for Hiawatha Line in Minneapolis
Star Tribune: Light rail upgrades running on time
Hiawatha LRT line opens 19th station in Bloomington
Metro Transit Hiawatha Line

External links
Metro Transit: American Boulevard Station

Railway stations in the United States opened in 2009
Metro Blue Line (Minnesota) stations in Hennepin County, Minnesota